Mufumbwe is a constituency of the National Assembly of Zambia. It covers the towns of Chizela, Kalengwa, Kangalesha and Mufumbwe in Mufumbwe District of North-Western Province.

List of MPs

References

Constituencies of the National Assembly of Zambia
Constituencies established in 1991
1991 establishments in Zambia